Prolepsis is an insect genus of mainly neotropical Diptera in the family Asilidae or robber flies.

Description
Medium-sized robber flies (14–25 mm) with antennae that have a relatively long third article. Abdomen is rather plump compared to many other asilids. Wings usually extending past the abdomen and often tinted or pigmented along most of their length. Coloration predominantly black to brown or reddish; often mimicking spider wasps. The two sexes can have distinctly different colors. Ventral side of the femur of the middle leg pair often with a thick patch of short and stout spines.

Biology
As is typical for robber flies, adults of Prolepsis species are ambush predators, taking off from a resting position on the ground or on branches to intercept other flying insects in mid-air. Prey are probably taken from a wide variety of insect orders: Robert Lavigne's Predator-Prey Database for the family Asilidae has one record for Prolepsis lucifer feeding on the dung beetle Canthidium globulum and four records for Prolepsis tristis feeding on the following identified prey species: the clown beetle Epierus formidolosus, the blister beetle Epicauta trichrus, the hoverfly Eristalis dimidiatus and the Western honeybee Apis mellifera. Herschel Raney's webpage for Prolepsis tristis includes example images of cannibalism and color variation among males. It also illustrates the extreme difference in coloration of both sexes that occurs in this particular species.

Larval stages have received little study to date, but the first instar larvae of P. lucifer are reported to prey voraciously on the subterranean scale insect or ground pearl Eurhizococcus brasiliensis, with possible biocontrol applications for protection of grapevines in Brazil

Taxonomy
The 17 recognized species included in Prolepsis are:

 Prolepsis chalcoprocta (Loew, 1866) (Cuba)
 Prolepsis colalao (Lamas, 1973) (Argentina)
 Prolepsis costaricensis (Lamas, 1973) (Costa Rica)
 Prolepsis crabroniformis (Schiner, 1867)
 Prolepsis elotensis (Martin, 1966) (Mexico)
 Prolepsis fax (Lynch Arribálzaga, 1881)
 Prolepsis fenestrata (Macquart, 1838)
 Prolepsis funebris (Lamas, 1973) (Brazil)
 Prolepsis huatajata (Lamas, 1973)
 Prolepsis indecisa (Lamas, 1973) (Argentina)
 Prolepsis lucifer  (Wiedemann, 1828) (Uruguay, Argentina, Brazil) 
 Prolepsis martini (Lamas, 1973) (Argentina)
 Prolepsis pluto (Lynch Arribálzaga, 1881)
 Prolepsis pseudopluto (Lamas, 1973) (Argentina)
 Prolepsis rosariana (Carrera, 1959) (Argentina, Brazil)
 Prolepsis sandaraca (Martin, 1966) (Mexico)
 Prolepsis tristis (Walker, 1851) (Mexico, USA)

Phylogeny 
Combined analysis of morphological and molecular characters places Prolepsis tristis in a clade corresponding to the subfamily Stenopogoninae, without however providing direct support for monophyly of this subfamily.

References

External links 
 Wikispecies page for Prolepsis
 Prolepsis page on bugguide.net
 Entry for Prolepsis tristis in the Illustrated Field Guide for asilids of Arkansas by Norman Lavers 

Asilidae genera